Epsilon Lyrae (ε Lyr, ε Lyrae), also known as the Double Double, is a multiple star system of at least five stars approximately 162 light-years away in the constellation of Lyra.

Star system 
The widest two components of the system are easily separated when viewed through binoculars, or even with the naked eye under excellent conditions.
The northern component is called ε1 (ADS 11635 AB in multiple star notation) and the southern ε2 (ADS 11635 CD); they lie around 160 light years from Earth and orbit each other over hundreds of thousands of years. When viewed at higher magnifications, each intuitively likely "star" proves to be a set of shorter-term, close-orbiting binary stars. Ability to view these sub-components is a common benchmark for the resolving power of telescopes, since they are so close together: the stars of ε1 were 2.35 arc-seconds apart in 2006, those of ε2 were separated by about the same amount in that year. Since the first high-precision measurements of their orbit in the 1980s, both binaries have moved only a few degrees in position angle.

The component stars of ε1 have magnitudes of 4.7 and 6.2 separated by 2.6" and have an orbital period that can only be crudely estimated at 1200 years, which places them at roughly 140 AU apart. Main components of ε2 have magnitudes 5.1 and 5.5 separated by 2.3", and orbit in perhaps half that period. ε1 and ε2 are more than 0.16 light years apart. An observer at one pair would see the other as strongly as a quarter (also known as half) Moon (which is about mv = −5.0), less than a degree away from each other.

In 2022, researchers at MarSEC (Marana Space Explorer Center) thanks to data from the TESS (Transiting Exoplanet Survey Satellite) discovered that the secondary component of ε1 is a variable star of the type Gamma Doradus with a main period of 0.415 days.

The fifth component of this system, orbiting one of the ε2 pair, was detected by speckle interferometry in 1985 and confirmed in two later observations.  No orbit can be prepared from such limited data, but its rapid motion suggests a period of a few tens of years. Its maximum observed separation of 0.2 arc-seconds precludes direct visual observation.

A further five nearby dimmer stars are also listed in multiple star catalogues:

{| class="wikitable" style="text-align:center;"
|+ Orbit pairs
|-
|
! scope="col" | Separation(arcsec)
! scope="col" | Separation(au)
! scope="col" | Most RecentPosition Angle
! scope="col" | Period(years)
! scope="col" | Semi-major axis(arcseconds)
! scope="col" | Notes
|-
! scope="row" | AB-CD
| 208.2
| 10,500
| 172
| 
|
| ε1-ε2
|-
! scope="row" | AB
| 2.3
| 116
| 347
| 1804.41
| 4.742
| components of ε1
|-
! scope="row" | CD
| 2.4
| 121
| 79
| 724.307
| 2.92
| components of ε2
|-
! scope="row" | Ca-Cb
| 0.1
| 5
| 225
| 
| 
| recently discoveredinterferometric companion
|}

References

External links 
 Epsilon Lyrae -- The Double Double
 Epsilon Lyrae

5
F-type main-sequence stars
A-type main-sequence stars
Lyra (constellation)
Lyrae, Epsilon
Lyrae, 04 5
173582
091919
7051
Durchmusterung objects